Solntsevo District is a district of Western Administrative Okrug of the federal city of Moscow, Russia. Population: 122,400 (2016),

History
It originated in 1938 as a dacha settlement and was named after the Russian word for Sun (", solntse). It used to be a separate town from 1971. Since May 1984 it has been included into Moscow. Former prime minister Mikhail Kasyanov and  2008 presidential election candidate Andrey Bogdanov are natives of Solntsevo.

The organized crime group Solntsevskaya Bratva based its name upon Solntsevo District.

References

Districts of Moscow
Defunct towns in Russia